Jungwon may refer to:

Jungwon-gyeong, former name of Chungju, North Chungcheong, South Korea when it was a sub-capital during the United Silla dynasty
Jungwon Province, one of the former provinces of Korea under the United Silla and Goryeo Dynasties, today North Chungcheong Province, South Korea
Jungwon Air Base in Chungju
Jungwon County, former county annexed by Chungju
Jungwon-gu, Seongnam, Gyeonggi Province, South Korea
Jung-won (Revised Romanization: Jeong-won), Korean unisex given name
Jungwon, leader of South Korean boyband, Enhypen